The 1993–94 National Professional Soccer League season was the tenth season for the league.

League standings

American Division

National Division

Playoffs

Scoring leaders

GP = Games Played, G = Goals, A = Assists, Pts = Points

League awards
 Most Valuable Player: Zoran Karić, Cleveland
 Defender of the Year: Sean Bowers, Detroit
 Rookie of the Year: Tarik Walker, Baltimore
 Goalkeeper of the Year: Victor Nogueira, Milwaukee
 Coach of the Year: Daryl Doran, St. Louis

All-NPSL Teams

First Team

Second Team

Third Team

All-NPSL Rookie Teams

External links
Major Indoor Soccer League II (RSSSF)
1994 in American Soccer

1993 in American soccer leagues
1994 in American soccer leagues
1993-94